Ernest Seth Yaney is a Ghanaian politician who served as member of the first parliament of the second republic for Chereponi Saboba constituency in the Northern Region of Ghana.

Politics 
Ernest Seth Yaney was elected during the 1969 Ghanaian parliamentary election on the ticket of the Progress Party (PP) as member of the first parliament of the second republic of Ghana. He was succeeded by Samuel U. Dalafu of the Popular Front Party (PFP) in the 1979 Ghanaian general election.

References 

Ghanaian MPs 1969–1972
People from Northern Region (Ghana)
Progress Party (Ghana) politicians
Year of birth missing (living people)
Living people